The Vegetarian Society of the United Kingdom is a British registered charity which was established on 30 September 1847 to promote vegetarianism.

History

In the 19th century a number of groups in Britain actively promoted and followed meat-free diets. Key groups involved in the formation of the Vegetarian Society were members of the Bible Christian Church, supporters of the Concordium, and readers of the Truth-Tester journal.

Bible Christian Church
The Bible Christian Church was founded in 1809 in Salford by Reverend William Cowherd after a split from the Swedenborgians. One distinctive feature of the Bible Christians was a belief in a meat-free diet, or ovo-lacto vegetarianism, as a form of temperance.

Concordium (Alcott House)
The Concordium was a boarding school near London on Ham Common, Richmond, Surrey, which opened in 1838. Pupils at the school followed a diet completely free of animal products, known today as a vegan diet. The Concordium was also called Alcott House, in honor of American education and food reform advocate Amos Bronson Alcott.

Truth-Tester and Physiological Conference, 1847

The Truth-Tester was a journal which published material supporting the temperance movement. In 1846 the editorship was taken over by William Horsell, operator of the Northwood Villa Hydropathic Institute in Ramsgate. Horsell gradually steered the Truth-Tester towards promotion of the 'Vegetable Diet'. In early 1847 a letter to the Truth-Tester proposed the formation of a Vegetarian Society. In response to this letter, William Oldham held what he called a "physiological conference" in July 1847 at Alcott House. Up to 130 attended, including Bible Christian James Simpson, who presented a speech. The conference passed a number of resolutions, including a resolution to reconvene at the end of September.

Ramsgate Conference, 1847
On 30 September 1847 the meeting which had been planned at the Physiological Conference took place at Northwood Villa Hydropathic Institute in Ramsgate. Joseph Brotherton, Member of Parliament for Salford, and a Bible Christian chaired. Bible Christian James Simpson was elected president of the society, Concordist William Oldham elected treasurer, and Truth-Tester editor William Horsell elected secretary. The name 'Vegetarian Society' was chosen for the new organisation by a unanimous vote.

After Ramsgate

The Vegetarian Society's first full public meeting was held in Manchester the following year. In 1853 it already had 889 members. The society made available publications on the topic sometimes accompanied by lectures. In 1897 its membership was about 5,000.

Manchester and London Vegetarian Society

In 1888, a split-off group from the Vegetarian Society formed known as the London Vegetarian Society (LVS). After this, the Vegetarian Society was often referred to as the Manchester Vegetarian Society (MVS). Relations between the two groups were strained because of their differences over the definition of vegetarianism.

Francis William Newman was President of the Manchester Vegetarian Society, 1873–1883. He made an associate membership possible for people who were not completely vegetarian, such as those who ate chicken or fish. Newman was critical of raw food vegetarianism which he rejected as fanatical. Between 1875-1896 membership for the Vegetarian Society was 2,159 and associate membership 1,785. Newman believed that abstinence from meat, fish and fowl should be the only thing the Society advocates and the Society should not be associated with other reform ideas. Under Newman's Presidency the Society flourished as income, associates and members increased. In regard to the associate membership, Newman commented:

The first President of the London Vegetarian Society was raw foodist Arnold Hills, and other members included Thomas Allinson and Mahatma Gandhi. Members of the LVS were more radical than the original Manchester Society. 

In 1969, the Manchester and London Vegetarian Society amalgamated as the Vegetarian Society of the United Kingdom. Historian Ina Zweiniger-Bargielowska has noted that "against the background of growing concern about the environment, animal rights, and food safety the society has flourished in recent decades."

During the 20th century, the Society's work focused primarily on public education. In fulfilling this mission, the Society worked with other community groups to educate the public about the benefits of eating healthily. The Vegetarian Society also participated in political events, as a pressure group with the aim of influencing food producers to remove non-vegetarian ingredients such as gelatine or cheese produced using animal rennet from their products. They sought manufacturers to become accredited and marked food products with the Society's trademarked seedling symbol. This accreditation includes the use of free range eggs, which other V symbols may not include. Their campaign was opposed to the labeling of products as vegetarian that contained fish. This action particularly affected restaurants. They also highlighted celebrities who claimed to be vegetarian but ate fish. As part of this campaign, in 1995, the Society produced the documentary Devour the Earth, written by Tony Wardle and narrated by Paul McCartney.

Journals

The Vegetarian Society first published The Vegetarian Messenger (1849–1860). It became The Dietetic Reformer and Vegetarian Messenger (1861–1897), The Vegetarian Messenger and Health Review (1898–1952), The Vegetarian (1953–1958) and The British Vegetarian (1959–1971). In 1885, Beatrice Lindsay, a graduate from Girton College, Cambridge became the first female editor of the Vegetarian Society’s Dietetic Reformer and Vegetarian Messenger.

The Vegetarian is the membership magazine of the Vegetarian Society and continues to be produced three times a year.

Current work
The Vegetarian Society is now a campaigning charity.

In 2017 the Vegetarian Society launched its Vegetarian Society Approved vegan trademark. The Vegetarian Society Approved trademarks are licensed to companies to display on products which contain only vegetarian/vegan ingredients, and also that nothing non-vegetarian/non-vegan was used during the production process. These trademarks can be seen on products in shops and supermarkets and also on dishes in restaurants. In 2022 McDonald's launched their McPlant burger across the UK which is accredited with the Vegetarian Society Approved vegan trademark.

National Vegetarian Week is the charity's flagship event. 

The Vegetarian Society Cookery School runs leisure classes in vegetarian and vegan cooking. It works alongside various charities and community groups to deliver bespoke cookery courses to groups. Plus the school trains professional chefs and those looking for a new career in the food sector with the Professional Chef’s Diploma.

Notable members
Notable members of the Vegetarian Society have included Peter Cushing, Henry Stephens Salt, Isaac Pitman, Jorja Fox, George Bernard Shaw, Mahatma Gandhi, Paul, Linda and Stella McCartney, and Jerome Flynn.

See also
 European Vegetarian Union
 International Vegetarian Union
 Linda McCartney Foods
 List of animal rights groups
 List of vegetarian organizations
 North American Vegetarian Society
 Veganism
 Vegetarian Society (Singapore)

References

Bibliography
 James Gregory, Of Victorians and Vegetarians: The Vegetarian Movement in Nineteenth-Century Britain. London: Tauris Academic Studies, 2006.

External links

 

 
1847 establishments in the United Kingdom
Altrincham
Health in Greater Manchester
Organisations based in Trafford
Organizations established in 1847
Vegetarian organizations
Vegetarianism in the United Kingdom